Reposal is a barbiturate derivative invented in the 1960s in Denmark. It has sedative, hypnotic and anticonvulsant properties, and was used primarily for the treatment of insomnia.

References 

Barbiturates
GABAA receptor positive allosteric modulators